Anne Saunders "Sandy" Barbour (born December 2, 1959) is an American athletic administrator who served as the athletic director at the Pennsylvania State University from 2014 to 2022, the University of California, Berkeley from 2004 to 2014, and Tulane University from 1996 to 1999.

Penn State 
Barbour directed the Penn State athletic programs, which have approximately 800 students in 31 sports (16 men’s/15 women’s) and an Intercollegiate Athletics staff of more than 300.

In 2020, Barbour was among the honorees on Sports Illustrated’s "The Unrelenting" list of powerful, influential and outstanding women in sports.

In 2018, she was named one of five finalists for Sports Business Journal’s prestigious Athletic Director of the Year.

Barbour is a member of the NCAA Football Oversight Committee, serving as Chair beginning in July 2021 for a term to end June 2023 and represents the Big Ten Conference on the NCAA Division I Council. In 2017, she was selected as one of the inaugural members of the United States Olympic and Paralympic Committee’s (USOC) Collegiate Sports Sustainability Think Tank. The Think Tank is charged with bridging the gap between high-contributing collegiate stakeholders and the Olympic Movement.

In March 2022, Barbour announced she would retire from Penn State in Summer 2022.

Cal and Tulane 
Barbour was the Director of Athletics at Cal from 2004-14.

Barbour served as athletic director at Tulane University from 1996 until resigning in 1999, having joined the staff as an associate athletic director in 1991.

References

External links
 Penn State profile
 Cal profile

1959 births
Living people
California Golden Bears athletic directors
Penn State Nittany Lions athletic directors
Tulane Green Wave athletic directors
Sportspeople from Annapolis, Maryland
Women college athletic directors in the United States